The following is a list of German military equipment of World War II which includes artillery, vehicles and vessels. World War II was a global war that was under way by 1939 and ended in 1945. Following political instability build-up in Europe from 1930, the Germans, which aimed to dominate Europe, attacked Poland on 1 September 1939, marking the start of World War II. The war in Europe ended 8 May 1945 with the unconditional surrender of Germany to the Allied forces.

The Germans used a number of type designations for their weapons. In some cases the type designation and series number (i.e. FlaK 30) are sufficient to identify a system, but occasionally multiple systems of the same type are developed at the same time and share a partial designation.

Personal arms

Knives and bayonets

Small arms

Pistols (manual and semi-automatic)

Automatic pistols and submachine guns

Rifles

Grenades and grenade launchers
Blendkörper 1H
Blendkörper 2H
Gewehr-Granatpatrone 40
Gewehr-Panzergranate
Gewehr-Sprenggranate
Gross Gewehr-Panzergranate
Gross Panzergranate 46 & 61
Hafthohlladung
Kampfpistole
Leuchtpistole 34
Leuchtpistole 42
Model 24 grenade
Model 39 grenade
Model 43 grenade
Molotov cocktail
Panzerwurfkörper 42
Panzerwurfmine
Propaganda-Gewehrgranate
Schiessbecher
Sprengpatrone
Sturmpistole
Wurfgranate Patrone 326
Wurfkorper 361

Mines
Behelfs-Schützenmine S.150
Glasmine 43
Hohl-Sprung mine 4672
Holzmine 42
Panzer stab 43
Riegel mine 43
Schu-mine 42
S-mine
Teller mine (all models)
Topfmine (all models)

Recoilless rifles
Panzerfaust

Panzerschreck

7.5 cm Leichtgeschütz 40
10.5 cm Leichtgeschütz 40
10.5 cm Leichtgeschütz 42
 – planned anti-tank weapon for aircraft

Flamethrowers
Einstossflammenwerfer 46
Flammenwerfer 35
Flammenwerfer 41
Abwehrflammenwerfer 42

Machine guns

Infantry rifles and dual-purpose machine guns

Vehicle and aircraft machine guns

Artillery

Demolition charges 

 Stielgranate 41
 Stielgranate 42

Infantry mortars
Krieghoff Model L
5 cm Granatwerfer 36
M19 Maschinengranatwerfer (automatic, bunker version of 5 cm Granatwerfer 36 on fixed mount)
5 cm Granatwerfer 40 – not accepted by army as army has started to retire 50mm mortars
8 cm Granatwerfer 34
Kz 8 cm GrW 42 (Kurzer 8 cm Granatwerfer 42) - weight reduction of 8 cm Granatwerfer 34
8 cm Granatwerfer 73 (1944) – no data on usage
8 cm minomet vz. 36 – captured from Czechs
8 cm Granatwerfer 33(ö)
10 cm Nebelwerfer 35
Granatwerfer 42 (12 cm sGrWr 42)

Heavy mortars and rocket launchers
8 cm Raketen-Vielfachwerfer (copy of Russian Katyusha rocket launcher)
Reihenwerfer
10 cm Nebelwerfer 40
15 cm Nebelwerfer 41 (multiple-rocket launcher)
Panzerwerfer (self-propelled multiple-rocket launcher with HE warheads)
Panzerwerfer 42 (also known as 15 cm Do-Gerat 42)
 20 cm leichter Ladungswerfer
21 cm Nebelwerfer 42 (multiple-rocket launcher)
21 cm heavy mortar 69
28/32 cm Nebelwerfer 41 (multiple-rocket launcher)
Schweres Wurfgerät 40/41 (rockets launched directly from crates)
Wurfrahmen 40 (rocket crates carrier/launcher)
30 cm Nebelwerfer 42 (multiple-rocket launcher)
30 cm Raketenwerfer 56 (multiple-rocket launcher)
38 cm schwerer Ladungswerfer
Karl-Gerät (Gerät 040 and Gerät 041) - self-propelled 600mm and 540mm mortars family

Field artillery
2 cm KwK 30 – Panzer II tank gun
3.7 cm KwK 36 – Panzer III tank gun
Skoda 37 mm A7
5 cm KwK 38 – Panzer III tank gun
5 cm KwK 39 – Panzer III tank gun
7.5 cm FK 16 nA
7.5 cm FK 18
7.5 cm FK 38
7.5 cm FK 7M85 (7.5 cm FK 40) – AT gun modified for dual AT/field gun role, 10 built
7.5 cm FK 7M59 – simplified production version
7.5 cm Gebirgsgeschütz 36 – most common German mountain gun of World War II
7.5 cm Infanteriegeschütz 37 (7.5 cm le.IG 37)
7.5 cm Infanteriegeschütz 42 (7,5 cm le.IG 42)
7.5 cm leichtes Infanteriegeschütz 18 (7,5 cm le.IG 18)
7.5 cm KwK 37 – Panzer IV tank gun
7.5 cm KwK 40 – Panzer IV tank gun
7.5 cm KwK 42 – Panther tank gun
Ehrhardt 7.5 cm Model 1901 – Anti-tank, field gun and coastal defense
Obice da 75/18 modello 34 (Acquired from the Italians by the Wehrmacht and redesignated 7.5 cm LeFH 255(i)) 
76 mm divisional gun M1942 (ZiS-3) (Captured from Russia by the Wehrmacht and redesignated Pak 36/39 (r)) 
8 cm kanon vz. 30
8.8 cm KwK 36 – Tiger I tank gun
8.8 cm KwK 43 – Tiger II tank gun
10 cm houfnice vz. 30 (howitzer)
10 cm K 17
10 cm M. 14 Feldhaubitze
10 cm schwere Kanone 18
Canon de 105 mle 1913 Schneider
10.5 cm Gebirgshaubitze 40
10.5 cm hruby kanon vz. 35
10.5 cm leFH 16
10.5 cm leFH 18 (most common German field gun)
10.5 cm leFH 18/40
 (developed but not accepted by army)
 (development incomplete by end of World War II)
10.5 cm leFH 18M
122 mm howitzer M1938 (M-30) (Captured from Russia by the Wehrmacht and redesignated 12.2 cm s.F.H.396(r))
Skoda K-series (among these guns "15 cm hrubá houfnice vz. 1937" was most common)
15 cm Schiffskanone C/28 in Mörserlafette
15 cm hrubá houfnice vz. 25
15 cm Kanone 18
15 cm Kanone 39
15 cm sFH 13 (obsolete)
15 cm sFH 18 (2nd most common German gun)
15 cm sIG 33 (heaviest infantry gun)
152 mm gun M1910/34 – captured from Russian
152 mm howitzer M1938 (M-10) – captured from Russian
17 cm Kanone 18 (heaviest German field artillery piece)
15 cm Schiffskanone C/28 in Mörserlafette (surplus guns on excess carriages of 17 cm Kanone 18)
203 mm howitzer M1931 (B-4) – captured from Russian
Obice da 210/22 – produced under German control after surrender of Italy
Canon de 220 L mle 1917 – captured from French

Fortress and siege guns
Rheinbote (rocket artillery)
V-3 cannon
12.7 cm SK C/34 naval gun (coastal defense)
15 cm K (E) (coastal defense, railroad gun)
17 cm K (E) (railroad gun)
15 cm Kanone 16 (coastal defense)
15 cm SK C/28 (coastal defense and 8 made into field guns)
15 cm Autokanone M. 15/16 (coastal defense and exported)
Canon de 155mm GPF (coastal defense)
20.3 cm K (E) (railroad gun)
21 cm K 12 (E) (railroad gun)
21 cm Mörser 16
21 cm Mörser 18
21 cm Kanone 38 – 1 cannon sent to Japan, 7 used domestically
21 cm Kanone 39
22-cm-Mörser (p) – captured from Poland and Yugoslavia
24 cm Haubitze 39
24 cm Kanone 3
 (prototype only)
24 cm Theodor Bruno Kanone (E) (railroad gun)
24 cm Theodor Kanone (E)
24 cm Kanone M. 16 – bought from Czechs in 1938
28 cm Haubitze L/12
Mortier de 280 modèle 1914 Schneider – captured from France
28 cm schwere Bruno Kanone (E)
Krupp K5 (28 cm railroad gun)
35.5 cm Haubitze M1
38 cm Siegfried K (E) (coastal defense, railroad gun)
38 cm SK C/34 naval gun (coastal defense)
40.6 cm SK C/34 gun (coastal defense)
42 cm Gamma Mörser
42 cm Haubitze M. 14/16
Schwerer Gustav (80 cm siege guns)

Anti-tank guns
25mm Puteaux anti-tank gun model 1937 (captured from French)
25 mm Hotchkiss anti-tank gun (captured from British)
2.8 cm sPzB 41
PaK 36 (37mm)
3.7 cm kanon PÚV vz. 34
Bofors 37 mm (M1934/36) – captured from Danish, Polish and British forcers
4.2 cm Pak 41
45 mm anti-tank gun M1937 (53-K) (Captured from Russia by Wehrmacht and redesignated Pak 184(r))
47 mm APX anti-tank gun (captured from French)
47mm Schneider anti-tank gun model 1936 (captured from French)
M35 Bohler and Breda 47mm guns of unclear origin
Austrian 4.7 cm IG 35/36 
47 mm kanon P.U.V. vz. 36 (German designation 4.7 cm Pak(t))
Cannone da 47/32 (German designation Pak 35/36(ö))
45 mm anti-tank gun M1932 (19-K) – (German designation 4.5 cm Pak 184(r) and 4.5 cm Pak 184/6(r))
5 cm Pak 38
57 mm anti-tank gun M1943 (ZiS-2) (Captured from Russia by Wehrmacht and redesignated Pak 208(r))
7.5 cm Pak 39
7.5 cm Pak 40 
7.5 cm Pak 41
7.5 cm Pak 97/38 (also known as PaK 97/38) – modernized French gun of 1897
7.62 cm Pak 36(r) (conversion of Russian 76 mm divisional gun M1936 (F-22))
8 cm PAW 600
Panzerwurfkanone 10H64
Thor's Hammer/Panzertod (105mm recoilless gun firing 81.4mm subcaliber projectile)
8.8 cm Raketenwerfer 43 (rocket artillery, also known as "Püppchen")
8.8 cm Flak 18/36/37/41 AT/AA gun
8.8 cm Pak 43 – most-produced heavy ATG
Cannone da 90/53 AA/AT gun (acquired from Italy)
12.8 cm Pak 44

Anti-tank weapons (besides anti-tank guns)

Wz. 35 anti-tank rifle (PzB 35) – captured from Poland
Panzerbüchse 39 (PzB 38/39)
Granatbüchse 39
Panzerschreck (also known as Raketenpanzerbüchse 43/54)
Solothurn S-18/1000
Solothurn S-18/1100
Panzerfaust anti-tank recoilless grenade launcher

Anti-aircraft weapons

Light anti-aircraft guns
Fliegerfaust hand-held anti-air rocket launcher
2 cm Flak 30/38/Flakvierling – the most produced German artillery piece of World War II, based on Russian 2-K AA gun design which was too complex to mass-produce in USSR
Gebirgsflak 38 – reduced-weight version of 2 cm Flak 30/38/Flakvierling
Cannone-Mitragliera da 20/77 (Scotti)
25 mm Hotchkiss anti-aircraft gun (captured from French)
3.7 cm Flak 18/36/37/43
3.7 cm SK C/30 – naval AA gun
3.7 cm FlaK 43
37 mm automatic air defense gun M1939 (61-K) (captured from Russia by Wehrmacht and redesignated 3.7 cm M39(r))
5 cm FlaK 41
Schräge Musik – also independently developed by Imperial Japanese Naval Air Service (both in use by May 1943)
Jagdfaust – air-to-air vertical-fire automated cannon

Henschel Hs 297 – launch 35 73mm-caliber short-range rockets
Solothurn ST-5 caliber 20 mm (.79 in)

Heavy anti-aircraft guns
Rheintochter (surface-to-air rocket)
Cannone da 75/46 C.A. modello 34 (acquired from Italy)
76 mm air defense gun M1938 (captured from Russia by Wehrmacht and redesignated Flak 38(r))
85 mm air defense gun M1939 (52-K) (captured from Russia by Wehrmacht and redesignated 8.5 cm Flak 39(r)) 
8.8 cm Flak 18/36/37/41 AT/AA gun
Cannone da 90/53 AA/AT gun (acquired from Italy)
10.5 cm FlaK 38
12.8 cm FlaK 40

Vehicles
Nazi Germany had captured many models of foreign equipment. In the list below, only most prominent captured models are listed.
For full listing of captured vehicles see List of foreign vehicles used by Nazi Germany in World War II

Tankette
AMR 35 – captured from French, some converted to mortar carrier

Tanks
Stridsvagn L-5 (incomplete prototype)
Leichttraktor
Grosstraktor
Panzer I
Panzer II
Skoda T-15 – Slovakian alternative to Panzer II, 5 built
Panzerkampfwagen II mit Schwimmkörper (Panzer II with floats)
Light Tank VK 1602 "Leopard"
Neubaufahrzeug (also known as Nb.Fz) - 5 built
Panzer 35(t)
Panzer 38(t)
Sd.Kfz. 140/1 Aufklärungspanzer 38(t) mit 2 cm KwK 38
Sd.Kfz. 140/1 Aufklärungspanzer 38(t) mit 7.5 cm KwK37 L/24
Panzer III
Panzerbeobachtungswagen III
Tauchpanzer III – amphibious (snorkel-fitted) Panzer III
Panzer IV
Panzerbeobachtungswagen IV (Pz. Beob. Wg. IV) – artillery observer
Panzerkampfwagen V Panther
Beobachtungspanzer Panther – artillery observer
Tiger I
Tiger II (also known as Königstiger or King Tiger)
Panzer VII Löwe – development halted
Panzer VIII Maus
Entwicklung series
E-5
E-10
E-25
E-50
E-75
Panzerkampfwagen E-100

Self-propelled guns

Tank-based

Anti-aircraft
Flakpanzer I
Flakpanzer 38(t)
Möbelwagen
Wirbelwind
Ostwind
Flakpanzer IV mit 3 cm FlaK Vierling (official designator for Zerstörer 45)
Kugelblitz
Flakpanzer Coelian (dual 5.5 cm autocannons)

Anti-tank
Panzerjäger I
5 cm PaK 38 auf Fahrgestell Panzerkampfwagen II
7.62 cm PaK 36(r) auf Fahrgestell Panzerkampfwagen II Ausf. D/E (Sd.Kfz. 132)
 Marder I (Sd.Kfz. 135)
Marder II (LaS 762)
Marder III  (Sd.Kfz. 138)
Marder III (Sd.Kfz. 139) 
Jagdpanzer 38(t) (Hetzer)
Jagdpanzer IV
Panzer IV/70 – Panzer IV-based SPG armed with 75mm gun from Panther tank
Jagdpanther (Sd.Kfz. 173)
Nashorn (Hornisse)
Jagdtiger (Sd.Kfz. 186)
Elefant also known as Ferdinand (Sd.Kfz. 184))

Assault & infantry guns 
Sturmpanzer I (Bison)
Sturmgeschütz III (StuG III or StuH 42, StuG III most-produced German AFV)
Sturmgeschütz IV (StuG IV)
Sturm-Infanteriegeschütz 33B
Brummbär also known as Sturmpanzer, Sturmpanzer 43 (Sd.Kfz. 166)
Grille (Sd.Kfz. 138/1)
15 cm sIG 33 auf Fahrgestell Panzerkampfwagen II (Sf)
Sturmtiger

Self propelled artillery
Wespe
Hummel
Heuschrecke 10 also known as "Waffenträger Geschützwagen IV")
10.5 cm K (gp.Sfl.) (Dicker Max)
Sturer Emil (2 built)

Other
 – 37mm gun on Hanomag chassis
7.7 cm FK WD Schlepper 50PS – 77mm gun on Hanomag chassis
Pz.Sph. 204(f) mit KwK 42 – gun on French Panhard 178 armoured car
8.8 cm Flak 18 auf Zgkw 12 – AA gun in field gun mount on Sd.Kfz. 8 half-track chassis
8.8 cm Flak 18 auf Zgkw 18 – AA gun in field gun mount on Sd.Kfz. 9 half-track chassis
Mittler Schutzenpanzerwagen S307(f) mit Reihenwerfer – mortar on French SOMUA MCG half-track truck chassis

Armored cars
Panzerspähwagen Kfz 13
Leichter Panzerspähwagen (light armored cars)
Sd.Kfz. 221
Sd.Kfz. 222
Sd.Kfz. 223
Sd.Kfz. 231 
Sd.Kfz. 260 (light armored radio car)
Sd.Kfz. 261 (light armored radio car)
Schwerer Panzerspähwagen (heavy armored cars)
Sd.Kfz. 232
Sd.Kfz. 233
Sd.Kfz. 263 (heavy armored radio car)
Sd.Kfz. 234 – 8 wheeled armored car (also known as Puma or Stummel)
Sd.Kfz. 250 half-track (machine gun and mortar versions)
Sd.Kfz. 251 half-track (machine gun and mortar versions)
Panzerwagen ADGZ
M39 Pantserwagen (captured from Dutch)
Panhard 178 (captured from French)

Armored carriers
Sd.Kfz. 3 (early) – unarmed personnel carrier of the 1920s
French Somua MCG/MCL mittlerer gepanzerter Zugkraftwagen S307/303(f)
French Unic P107 leichter Zugkraftwagen U304(f))
Gepanzerter Mannschaftstransportwagen 'Kätzchen' – 2 built
Munitions Selbstfahrlafette auf Fahrgestell Panzerkampfwagen II (Wespe chassis as ammunition carrier)
Munitionspanzer 38(t) (sf) Ausf.K (Sd.Kfz..138/1)
Sd.Kfz. 252 half-track ammunition carrier
Borgward B III – armoured ammunition carrier

Engineering and command
Springer vehicle (demolition vehicle)
Borgward IV (demolition vehicle)
Goliath tracked mine
 (mine clearance vehicle, prototype only)
Brückenleger auf Panzerkampfwagen II (bridge layer on Panzer II chassis)
Minenräumer III (also known as Minenräumpanzer III) – mine-clearing vehicle on Panzer III chassis
Kleiner Panzerbefehlswagen (command version of Panzer I)
Panzerbefehlswagen III (command version of Panzer III)
Panzerbefehlswagen IV (Pz. Bef. Wg. IV) (command version of Panzer IV)
Befehlspanzer Panther (command version of Panther tank)
Kugelpanzer – cable-laying vehicle, supplied to Japan
Sd.Kfz. 247 – armored command car
Sd.Kfz. 253 half-track artillery observer
Infanterie Sturmsteg auf Fahrgestell Panzerkampfwagen IV (infantry assault bridge version of the Panzer IV)
Instandsetzungskraftwagen I (maintenance vehicle version of the Panzer I)
 – tank-lifting maintenance crane

Trucks
Opel Blitz (also Maultier (late Sd.Kfz. 3) half-track versions)
Mercedes-Benz L3000
Krupp Protze
Kfz.19 – Telephone truck
Kfz.21 – Staff car
Kfz.68 – Radio mast carrier
Kfz.69 – Standard configuration for towing the 3,7 cm PaK 36
Kfz.70 – Standard configuration for personnel carrying
Kfz.81 – Ammo carrier conversion for 2 cm FlaK gun, usually towed
Kfz.83 – Generator carrier for anti-aircraft spotlight, usually towed
Borgward B 3000 
Sd.Kfz. 4 half-track

Polski Fiat 621- Captured from Polish
Tatra 111
Zis-5- Captured from Soviets

Passenger cars
Volkswagen Kübelwagen
Volkswagen Schwimmwagen – amphibious car
Einheits-PKW der Wehrmacht
 (lightweight class)
 (medium weight class)

Mercedes-Benz W31

Trippel SG6 amphibious car

Motorcycles

BMW R75
Zündapp KS 750

Zündapp KS 600
Zündapp K 800
NSU
DKW NZ 350
Nimbus (motorcycle) – Denmark-built

Tractors and prime movers
Landwasserschlepper (also known as Land-Wasser-Schlepper) amphibious tractor
Schwerer Wehrmachtschlepper, also AA and multiple-rocket launcher versions do exist.
Sd.Kfz. 2 (HK 101) – lightest German tractor of World War II (half-track and motorcycle hybrid)
Maultier half-truck
Sd.Kfz. 4 half-track
Sd.Kfz. 6 half-track
Sd.Kfz. 7 half-track
Sd.Kfz. 8 half-track
Sd.Kfz. 9 half-track
Sd.Kfz. 10 light half-track
Sd.Kfz. 11 half-track
Bergepanzer III – PzKpfw III chassis
Bergepanzer IV – PzKpfw IV chassis
Bergepanther (Sd.Kfz. 179) – PzKpfw V Panther chassis 347 produced (1943–1945)
Bergetiger – PzKpfw VI Tiger I chassis
Bergepanzer 38(t) – Jagdpanzer 38 chassis, 170 produced (1944–1945)
Bergepanzer T-34 – Captured T-34 chassis
Sd.Kfz. 254 tracked artillery tractor
Raupenschlepper, Ost (also known as RSO) – advanced tracked tractor
Saurer RR-7

Miscellaneous vehicles
 – Army trailer
 – Infantry trailers
 – Infantry cart IF8
Meillerwagen – V-2 rocket transporter
 – Trailer attachment hook
Railroad plough

Navy ships and war vessels

Siebel ferry – main Wehrmacht landing craft

Aircraft

Secret weapons

V-1 flying bomb
V-2
V3 cannon
Panzer VIII Maus

Radars
Freya radar

Würzburg radar
FuG 25a Erstling
Seetakt radar
Flensburg radar detector

Missiles and bombs

Anti-tank bombs
SD 4 HL 
SD 4/HL RS
SD 9/HL
Armor-piercing bombs
SC 10
SC 10 DW
PC 500 'Pauline'
PC 1000 'Pol'
PC 1600
PC 500 RS
PC 1000 RS
PC 1800 RS
PD 500
PD 1000
Cluster bombs
AB 23
AB 250-2
AB 250-3
AB 500-1
AB 500-1B
AB 500-3A
AB 70-D1
BDC 10
High explosive bombs
SB 1000
SB 1800
SB 2500
SC 50
SC 250
SC 500
SC 1000 "Hermann"
SC 1200
SC 1800 "Satan"
SC 2000
SC 2500 "Max"

Shrapnel bombs
SD 1
SD 1 FRZ
SD 2
SD 10 A
SD 10 FRZ
SD 10 C
SD 15
SBe 50
SD 50
SD 70
SBe 250
SD 250
SD 500
SD 1400 "Esau"
SD 1700 "Sigismund"
Rockets and Missiles
R4M (AA/AT rocket)
Werfer-Granate 21 (air-to-air rocket)
Blohm & Voss L 10 unmanned torpedo glider
Fritz X anti-ship guided bomb (also known as PC 1400)
Henschel Hs 293 anti-ship guided bomb
Henschel Hs 294 anti-ship guided bomb
Henschel Hs 298 radio-guided air-to-air missile
Ruhrstahl X-4 wire-guided air-to-air missile
Kramer Rk 344, air-to-air missile (rocket-powered)

Cartridges and shells
Panzergranate 39

See also
List of Sd.Kfz. designations
List of World War II firearms of Germany
German designations of foreign artillery in World War II
German designations of foreign firearms in World War II
Uniforms of the German Army (1935–1945)

References

Further reading

External links
 German Weapons During WW2 (Rifles, Guns, Mines, Vehicles)

 
 
Germany Army World War II
Military equipment